The sand martin (Riparia riparia), also known as the bank swallow (in the Americas), collared sand martin, or common sand martin, is a migratory passerine bird in the swallow family. It has a wide range in summer, embracing practically the whole of Europe and the Mediterranean countries and across the Palearctic to the Pacific Ocean. It is a Holarctic species also found in North America. It winters in eastern and southern Africa, South America, and the Indian Subcontinent.

Taxonomy
This species was first described by Carl Linnaeus in his 1758 10th edition of Systema Naturae, and originally named Hirundo riparia; the description consisted of the simple "H[irundo] cinerea, gula abdomineque albis" – "an ash-grey swallow, with white throat and belly" – and the type locality was simply given as "Europa". The specific name means "of the riverbank"; it is derived from the Latin ripa "riverbank".

The pale martin of northern India and southeastern China is now usually split as a separate species Riparia diluta. It has paler grey-brown upperparts and a less distinct breast band. It winters in Pakistan southern India and Sri Lanka.

Description

The sand martin is brown above, white below with a narrow brown band on the breast; the bill is black, the legs brown. The young have rufous tips to the coverts and margins to the secondaries.

Its brown back, white throat, small size and quick jerky flight separate it at once from similar swallows, such as the common house martin (Delichon urbicum), the American cliff swallow (Petrochelidon pyrrhonota) or other species of Riparia. Only the banded martin (Neophedina cincta) of sub-Saharan Africa is similar, but the sand martin only occurs there in (the northern) winter.

Measurements:

 Length: 
 Weight: 
 Wingspan: 

The sand martin's twittering song is continuous when the birds are on the wing and becomes a conversational undertone after they have settled in the roost. The harsh alarm is heard when a passing falcon, crow or other suspected predator requires combined action to drive it away.

Ecology
Linnaeus already remarked on this species' breeding habits: Habitat in Europae collibus arenosis abruptis, foramine serpentino—"it lives in Europe, in winding holes in sheer sandy hills". It has been observed that sand martins favour loess as a particular type of ground to nest in. Sand martins are generally found near larger bodies of water, such as rivers, lakes or even the ocean, throughout the year.

In Britain, the sand martin appears on its breeding grounds as the first of its family, starting towards the end of March, just in advance of the barn swallow. In northern Ohio, they arrive in numbers by mid-April, about 10 days earlier than they did 100 years ago. At first, they flit over the larger bodies of water alone, in search of early flies. Later parties accompany other swallow species, but for a time, varying according to weather, the birds remain at these large waters and do not visit their nesting haunts. The sand martin departs early, at any rate from its more northerly haunts. In August, the gatherings at the nightly roost increase enormously, though the advent and departure of passage birds causes great irregularity in numbers. They are essentially gone from their breeding range by the end of September.

Their food consists of small insects, mostly gnats and other flies whose early stages are aquatic.

The sand martin is sociable in its nesting habits; from a dozen to many hundred pairs will nest close together, according to available space. The nests are at the end of tunnels ranging from a few inches to three or four feet in length, bored in sand or gravel. The actual nest is a litter of straw and feathers in a chamber at the end of the burrow; it soon becomes a hotbed of parasites. Four or five white eggs are laid about mid-late May, and a second brood is usual in all but the most northernly breeding sites.

Globally, it is not rare and classified as a species of least concern (but noted to be decreasing) by the IUCN. It does have some national and local protections, as certain populations have declined or face threats from habitat loss and fragmentation. In Canada, it is listed as Threatened under Schedule 1 of the federal Species at Risk Act (SARA) due to the loss of 98% of its Canadian population over the past 40 years. They are considered threatened in California, where populations exist in the Sacramento Valley and at two coastal sites, Año Nuevo State Park and Fort Funston.

Gallery

References

Further reading

External links

 Sand Martin - Species text in The Atlas of Southern African Birds
 Ageing and sexing (PDF; 1.4 MB) by Javier Blasco-Zumeta & Gerd-Michael Heinze
 Feathers of sand martin (Riparia riparia) 
 Bank swallow Species Account – Cornell Lab of Ornithology
 Bank swallow at Environment Canada
 
 
 

Riparia
Holarctic birds
Birds of Africa
Birds described in 1758
Taxa named by Carl Linnaeus
Cosmopolitan birds